The 2019 Columbia Lions football team represented Columbia University in the 2019 NCAA Division I FCS football season as a member of the Ivy League. They were led by fifth-year head coach Al Bagnoli and played their home games at Robert K. Kraft Field at Lawrence A. Wien Stadium. They finished the season 3–7, 2–5 in Ivy League play to finish in a tie for sixth place. Columbia averaged 5,376 fans per game

Previous season

The Lions finished the 2018 season 6–4, 3–4 in Ivy League play to finish in a three-way tie for fourth place.

Preseason

Preseason media poll
The Ivy League released their preseason media poll on August 8, 2019. The Lions were picked to finish in sixth place.

Schedule

Game summaries

at Saint Francis

Georgetown

at Princeton

Central Connecticut

Penn

at Dartmouth

at Yale

Harvard

Brown

at Cornell

References

Columbia
Columbia Lions football seasons
Columbia Lions football